The Battle of Les Avins or Avein took place on 20 May 1635, outside the town of Les Avins, near Huy in modern Belgium, then part of the Bishopric of Liège. It was the first major engagement of the 1635 to 1659 Franco-Spanish War, a connected conflict of the Thirty Years' War.  

France supported the Dutch Republic in its war of independence from Spain, but avoided direct involvement. In February 1635, the two countries agreed to divide the Spanish Netherlands and in May, a French army of 27,000 entered Liège, intending to link up with the Dutch at Maastricht and attack Leuven. Outside Les Avins, they ran into a Spanish force of around 16,000; the French made a series of frontal assaults and eventually over-ran their positions, inflicting around 4,000 to 5,000 casualties.

Background

17th century Europe was dominated by the struggle between the Bourbon kings of France, and their Habsburg rivals in Spain and the Holy Roman Empire. In 1938, historian CV Wedgwood argued the 1618 to 1648 Thirty Years War and the 1568 to 1648 Dutch revolt formed part of a wider, ongoing European struggle, with the Habsburg-Bourbon conflict at its centre. Now generally accepted by modern historians, this makes the Franco-Spanish War a connected conflict, which is essential to understanding strategic objectives.   

Habsburg territories in the Spanish Netherlands, Franche-Comté, and the Pyrenees blocked French expansion, and made it vulnerable to invasion. Occupied by domestic Huguenot rebellions from 1622 to 1630, France looked for opportunities to weaken the Habsburgs, while avoiding direct conflict. This included supporting the Dutch against Spain, and financing Swedish intervention in the Empire, starting in 1630, when Gustavus Adolphus of Sweden invaded Pomerania. 

When fighting restarted at the end of the Twelve Years' Truce in 1621, the Spanish initially won a series of victories but by 1633 were on the retreat. The powerful Amsterdam mercantile lobby saw this as an opportunity to end the war on favourable terms, and although negotiations ended without result, the Dutch peace party grew in strength. At the same time, defeat at Nördlingen in September 1634 forced the Swedes to retreat, while most of their German allies left the war after the 1635 Treaty of Prague.

Concerned by the prospect of the Habsburgs making peace on favourable terms in both the Empire and the Netherlands, Louis XIII and his chief minister Richelieu decided on direct intervention. In February 1635, they signed an alliance with the Dutch, agreeing to divide the Spanish Netherlands, followed in April by the Treaty of Compiègne with Sweden.

Battle

Much of the fighting focused on different parts of the Spanish Road, an overland supply route connecting Spanish possessions in Northern Italy to Flanders. After 1601, it was rarely used for moving soldiers, but remained vital for trade, and went through areas essential to French security. At the start of 1635, France threatened the Road at a variety of points; as well as 27,000 men under Urbain de Maillé-Brézé in Picardy, they had armies in Champagne, Lorraine, the Sarre, and the Valtellina. However, the 1635 campaign showed they had seriously underestimated the complexity of the logistics required to support over 100,000 troops, while there was very little co-ordination between the different theatres. 

In May, Louis declared war on Spain, claiming to be responding to a request for support from the Elector of Trier, whose territories were an important part of the Road and had been occupied by Spanish troops. The French entered the Prince-Bishopric of Liège, last point in the Road, in two divisions, one led by Maillé-Brézé and the other by Châtillon. Their intention was to link up with Dutch forces based at Maastricht, under Frederick Henry, Prince of Orange, and then attack Leuven. Outside Les Avins, they made contact with a Spanish force of around 16,000 under Thomas Francis, Prince of Carignano, supported by his deputies Bucquoy and the Count of Feria.  

The Spanish had been ordered to simply act as a blocking force but Carignano allowed himself to be drawn into battle with a larger army. Although inferior in numbers, his troops were more experienced and held a strong position, with the infantry placed behind a series of hedges and artillery covering the approaches. The French commanders debated whether to attack, before deciding retreat would be more dangerous. Their artillery commander, Charles de La Porte, positioned his guns to provide covering fire; Châtillon and Maillé-Brézé drew up their troops in standard formation, infantry in the centre and cavalry on the wings, before launching a frontal assault.

On the right, Maillé-Brézé was initially repulsed with heavy losses, before rallying and attacking again. On the left and centre, Châtillon attacked the Spanish artillery with 4,000 men and eventually over-ran their positions by weight of numbers. Seeing this, the French reserve of 5,000 came up and assuming this to be a new army, Carignano ordered a general retreat. Most of the Spanish casualties occurred in this phase of the battle; estimates range from a total of 4,000, to 5,000 including prisoners, among them Charles of Austria, nephew of Emperor Ferdinand and Feria. Exact French losses are unknown but they suffered severely in their assault.

Aftermath

News of the victory was received in Paris with elation, and led to unrealistic optimism about the rest of the campaign. It also caused friction between the French commanders, with Châtillon claiming he had been sidelined to ensure Maillé-Brézé won the glory. After linking up with the Dutch, their combined force totalled around 45,000 men, but Fredrick Henry insisted on taking Tienen, a place of limited strategic value. Cardinal-Infante Ferdinand of Austria, governor of the Spanish Netherlands, withdrew to Leuven, leaving a garrison of 1,200 at Tienen. Its capture on 10 June resulted in one of the most serious atrocities of the Dutch Revolt; the town was sacked, over 200 civilians killed and many buildings damaged, including Catholic churches and monasteries. This ended prospects of winning over the predominately Catholic population of the Southern Netherlands, stiffened Spanish resistance, and was particularly embarrassing for Richelieu, a Cardinal in the Catholic church.        

Until the advent of railways in the 19th century, water was the primary means of bulk transportation; Leuven's position on the River Dyle made its capture essential for an offensive into Brabant. By the time the Franco-Dutch army began the siege on 24 June, desertion due to lack of food or pay had reduced the French army to under 17,000. When a Spanish force advanced on Leuven in early July, the siege was abandoned; on 28 July, the loss of the Dutch fortress of Schenkenschans prompted Frederick Henry to withdraw from the Spanish Netherlands and march to its relief.

Notes

References

Sources
 
 
 
 
 
 
 
 
 
 
 
 
 
 
 

Les Avins
Les Avins
Les Avins
Les Avins
Avins
Les Avins
1635 in Europe
Battle
Huy